EnQuest plc is an independent United Kingdom-based petroleum exploration and production company which operates mainly in the United Kingdom Continental Shelf. EnQuest shares are included on the main list of the London Stock Exchange and the firm holds a secondary listing on Nasdaq OMX Stockholm.

History
The company was formed in April 2010 by a combination of the demerged British North Sea assets of Petrofac and Lundin Petroleum.

Operations
The other four (Broom, Heather, Thistle and Deveron) were part-owned by Lundin Petroleum prior to the creation of EnQuest and are capable of producing . EnQuest is the operator of each field; its financial interests are as follows: In November, 2013, EnQuest were granted permission to develop the Kraken field which has an estimated 140 million barrels of oil.

References

External links

Oil and gas companies of the United Kingdom
British companies established in 2010
Companies listed on the London Stock Exchange
Organisations associated with Shetland